Talokan or Talocan may refer to:

 Taloqan, a city in northeastern Afghanistan
 Tlālōcān, a mythological city in Aztec mythology, ruled by Tlāloc and his consort Chalchiuhtlicue
 Talokan (Marvel Cinematic Universe), an underwater kingdom in the Marvel Cinematic Universe ruled by the mutant Namor

See also 
 Taleqan (disambiguation)